The Alessandri family of Chile is of Italian origin, became politically influential during the early part of the 20th century, and has played (and still plays) a significant role in Chilean politics. The first Alessandri who came to Chile was named Giuseppe Pietro Alessandri Tarzi. He arrived in 1821 as consul posterior, representative of the Kingdom of Sardinia and Piedmonte, on a ship that departed from Pisa.

Alessandri family's most prominent members
José Pedro Alessandri Palma (1864–1923), politician, senator and businessman
Arturo Alessandri Palma (1868–1950), politician, twice President of Chile (1920–1925) and (1932–1938), and the most influential political figure of his time
Rosa Ester Rodríguez Velasco, First Lady (1920–1925) and (1932–1938)
Jorge Alessandri Rodríguez (1896–1986), politician and businessman, President of Chile (1958–1964), presidential candidate in the 1970 election
Fernando Alessandri Rodríguez (1897–1982), politician and presidential candidate in the 1946 election
Gilberto Alessandri Palma (1858?), older brother of Arturo Alessandri Palma, prominent dentist in Punta Arenas and founder of various humanitarian organizations
Hernán Alessandri Rodríguez (1900–1982), MD and medical reformer
Eduardo Alessandri Rodríguez (1903–1973), politician
Arturo Alessandri Besa (1923), politician and presidential candidate in the 1993 election
Silvia Alessandri Montes (1927), politician
Gustavo Alessandri Valdes (1929), politician and businessman
Gustavo Alessandri Balmaceda (1961), politician
Magdalena Matte Lecaros (b. 1950), civil engineer, businesswoman, politician. Granddaughter of Arturo Alessandri Palma
Felipe Alessandri Vergara (b. 1975), lawyer, businessman, politician; mayor of Santiago.

Timeline of elected positions

See also
History of Chile
Alessandri (disambiguation)

 
Chilean families